Sysoyevo is a rural locality (a village) in Posyolok Nikologory, Vyaznikovsky District, Vladimir Oblast, Russia. The population was 93 as of 2010.

Geography 
Sysoyevo is located 23 km southwest of Vyazniki (the district's administrative centre) by road. Priozyorny is the nearest rural locality.

References 

Rural localities in Vyaznikovsky District